Asunción is the capital and the largest city of Paraguay.

The city stands on the eastern bank of the Paraguay River, almost at the confluence of this river with the Pilcomayo River. The Paraguay River and the Bay of Asunción in the northwest separate the city from the Occidental Region of Paraguay and from Argentina in the south part of the city. The rest of the city is surrounded by the Central Department.

Asunción is one of the oldest cities in South America and the longest continually inhabited area in the Río de la Plata Basin; for this reason it is known as "the Mother of Cities". From Asunción, Spanish colonial expeditions departed to found other cities, including the second foundation of Buenos Aires, that of other important cities such as Villarrica, Corrientes, Santa Fe, Córdoba, Santa Cruz de la Sierra and 65 more.

Administratively, the city forms an autonomous capital district, not a part of any department. The metropolitan area, called Gran Asunción, includes the cities of San Lorenzo, Fernando de la Mora, Lambaré, Luque, Mariano Roque Alonso, Ñemby, San Antonio, Limpio, Capiatá and Villa Elisa, which are part of the Central Department. The Asunción metropolitan area has around two million inhabitants. Asunción is one of the best cities for investments, both in construction and services, thus being one of the cities in the region with the highest economic growth, nowadays.

The Globalization and World Cities Research Network classifies Asunción as a "Gamma City". It is the home of the national government, principal port, and the chief industrial, political, economic and cultural center of Paraguay. Near Asunción are the headquarters of the CONMEBOL, the continental governing body of association football in South America. Asunción ranks as one of the cheapest cities in the world for foreign visitors, and the third safest capital in Latin America, behind Buenos Aires and Santiago, according to InSight Crime.

History

The Spanish conquistador Juan de Ayolas (died c. 1537) may have first visited the site of the future city on his way north, up the Paraguay River, looking for a passage to the mines of Alto Perú (present-day Bolivia). Later, Juan de Salazar y Espinosa and Gonzalo de Mendoza, a relative of Pedro de Mendoza, were sent in search of Ayolas, but failed to find him. On his way up and then down the river, de Salazar stopped briefly at a bay in the left bank to resupply his ships. He found the natives friendly, and decided to found a fort there in August 1537. He named it Nuestra Señora Santa María de la Asunción (Our Lady Saint Mary of the Assumption – the Roman Catholic Church celebrates the Feast of the Assumption on August 15).

In 1542 natives destroyed Buenos Aires, and the Spaniards there fled to Asunción. Thus the city became the center of a large Spanish colonial province comprising part of Brazil, present-day Paraguay and northeastern Argentina: the giant Province of the Indies. In 1603 Asunción was the seat of the First Synod of Asunción, which set guidelines for the evangelization of the natives in their lingua franca, Guaraní.

In 1731 an uprising under José de Antequera y Castro was one of the first rebellions against Spanish colonial rule. The uprising failed, but it was the first sign of the independent spirit that was growing among the criollos, mestizos and natives of Paraguay. The event influenced the independence of Paraguay, which subsequently materialized in 1811. The secret meetings between the independence leaders to plan an ambush against the Spanish Governor in Paraguay (Bernardo de Velasco) took place at the home of Juana María de Lara, in downtown Asunción. On the night of May 14 and May 15, 1811, the rebels succeeded and forced governor Velasco to surrender. Today, Lara's former home, known as Casa de la Independencia (House of the Independence), operates as a museum and historical building.

After Paraguay became independent, significant change occurred in Asunción. Under the rule of Gaspar Rodríguez de Francia (in office 1813–1840) roads were built throughout the city and the streets were named. However, during the presidency of Carlos Antonio López (President 1844–1862) Asunción (and Paraguay) saw further progress as the new president implemented new economic policies. More than 400 schools, metallurgic factories and the first railroad service in South America were built during the López presidency. After López died (1862), his son Francisco Solano López became the new president and led the country through the disastrous Paraguayan War that lasted for five years (1864–1870). On 1 January 1869, the capital city Asunción fell to Brazilian forces led by Gen. João de Souza da Fonseca Costa. After the end of the armed conflict, Brazilian troops occupied Asunción until 1876.

Many historians have claimed that this war provoked a steady downfall of the city and country, since it massacred two-thirds of the country's population. Progress slowed down greatly afterwards, and the economy stagnated.

After the Paraguayan War, Asunción began a slow attempt at recovery. Towards the end of the 19th century and during the early years of the 20th century, a flow of immigrants from Europe and the Ottoman Empire came to the city. This led to a change in the appearance of the city as many new buildings were built and Asunción went through an era more prosperous than any since the war.

A tramway in Asunción opened in 1871, initially using horse-drawn trams and steam-powered trams but with electric trams being introduced in 1913. The last tram service was discontinued around 1995, followed by formal closure in November 1997.

Geography

Being at the Argentina–Paraguay border, Asunción is located between the parallels 25° 15' and 25° 20' of south latitude and between the meridians 57° 40' and 57° 30' of west longitude. The city sits on the left bank of the Paraguay River, almost at the confluence of this river with the River Pilcomayo. The Paraguay River and the Bay of Asunción in the northwest separate the city from the Occidental Region of Paraguay and Argentina in the south part of the city. The rest of the city is surrounded by the Central Department.

With its location along the Paraguay River, the city offers many landscapes; it spreads out over gentle hills in a pattern of rectangular blocks. Places such as Cerro Lambaré, a hill located in Lambaré, offer a spectacular show in the springtime because of the blossoming lapacho trees in the area. Parks such as Parque Independencia and Parque Carlos Antonio López offer large areas of typical Paraguayan vegetation and are frequented by tourists. There are several small hills and slightly elevated areas throughout the city, including Cabará, Clavel, Tarumá, Cachinga, and Tacumbú, among others.

Districts and neighborhoods 
See: Barrios of Asunción

Asunción is organized geographically into districts and these in turn bring together the different neighborhoods.

Climate
Relative humidity is high throughout the year, so the heat index is higher than the true air temperature in the summer, and in the winter it can feel cooler. The average annual precipitation is high, with  distributed in over 80 days yearly.

Snow is unknown in modern times, but it fell during the Little Ice Age, last time in June 1751.

Asunción generally has a very short dry season between May and September, but the coldest months are June, July and August. Slight frosts can occur on average one or two days a year. The wet season covers the remainder of the year.

During the wet season, Asunción is generally hot and humid though towards the end of this season, it becomes noticeably cooler. In contrast, Asunción's dry season is pleasantly mild. Asuncion's annual precipitation values observe a summer maximum, due to severe subtropical summer thunderstorms which travel southward from northern Paraguay, originating in the Gran Chaco region of the northwestern part of the country.

Demographics
The population is approximately 540,000 people in the city proper. Roughly 30% of Paraguay's 6 million people live within Greater Asunción. Sixty-five percent of the total population in the city are under the age of 30.

The population has increased greatly during the last few decades as a consequence of internal migration from other Departments of Paraguay, at first because of the economic boom in the 1970s, and later because of economic recession in the countryside. The adjacent cities in the Gran Asunción area, such as Luque, Lambaré, San Lorenzo, Fernando de la Mora and Mariano Roque Alonso, have absorbed most of this influx due to the low cost of the land and easy access to Asunción. The city has ranked as the least expensive city to live in for five years running by Mercer Human Resource Consulting.

Population by sex and age according to the 2002 census

Religion

Approximately 90% of the population of Asunción professes Catholicism. The Roman Catholic Archdiocese of Asunción covers an area of  including the city and surrounding area and has a total population of 1,780,000 of whom 1,612,000 are Catholic. The Catholic Archbishop is Eustaquio Pastor Cuquejo Verga, C.SS.R. In Paraguay's capital there are also places of worship of other Christian denominations, the Church of Jesus Christ of Latter-day Saints, as well as of other religions including Islam, Buddhism and Judaism.

Language
Most people in Paraguay speak one of two languages as their principal language: Paraguayan Spanish (spoken by 56.9% of the population) and Guaraní (spoken by 11.2%). 27.4% of the population speaks the Jopará dialect, a mix of Guaraní with loanwords from Spanish (Creole). Other languages are represented by 4.5% of the population.

Education

Schools

The city has a large number of both public and private schools. The best-known public schools are the Colegio Nacional de la Capital (which is one of the oldest schools in the city, founded in 1877), Colegio Técnico Nacional, Colegio Nacional Presidente Franco and Colegio Nacional Asunción Escalada. The best-known private schools are, American School of Asunción, Colegio San José, St. Annes School, Colegio del Sol, Colegio Santa Clara, Colegio Goethe and Colegio de la Asunción, Colegio Las Almenas, Colegio Campoalto, Colegio Dante Alighieri, Colegio San Francisco, Colegio San Ignacio de Loyola, Colegio Santa Teresa de Jesús, Colegio Inmaculado Corazón de María, Salesianito, Colegio Cristo Rey, Colegio Internacional.

Universities

The main universities in the city are the Universidad Americana and the Universidad Nacional de Asunción (state-run). The Universidad Nacional de Asunción was founded in 1889 and has an enrollment of just over 40,000 students. The Universidad Católica Nuestra Señora de la Asunción was founded in 1960 and has a current enrollment of around 21,000 students. The Católica has a small campus in the downtown area next to the cathedral and a larger campus in the Santa Ana neighborhood, outwards toward the adjoining city of Lambaré, while the Universidad Nacional has its main campus in the city of San Lorenzo, some  eastward from Asunción. There are also a number of smaller, privately-run universities such as Uninorte, Universidad Católica Nuestra Señora de la Asunción and Universidad Autónoma de Asunción, among others.

Economy

Commerce has expanded considerably in recent years stretching towards the suburbs where shopping malls and supermarkets have been built. Paraguay's only stock exchange, the BVPASA, is located here.

In Asuncion, the most significant companies, businesses and investment groups are headquartered. The attractiveness of the city has been attributed to its easy going tax policies. Asunción has unrestrained taxes on the investments and movements of capital. In addition to this, the Asunción stock exchange traded up 485.7% in August 2012 relative to August 2011. There is also no income tax for investors in Bonds of Asunción Stock Exchange. Incentives like these attract significant foreign investment into the city. According to many Latin American experts, Paraguay is tapped as one of the top three counties with the best investment climate in Latin America and the Caribbean as well it remains the most attractive nation of the hemisphere in doing business and is equipped with a series of legislations that protect strategic investments and guarantee a friendly environment for the development of large industrial plants and infrastructure projects. The city is the economic center of Paraguay, followed by Ciudad del Este and Encarnación.

Businesses 
 

Manufactura de Pilar (founded 1939), textile production and manufacturing company

Transportation

Because the Paraguay River runs right next to Asunción the city is served by a river terminal in the downtown area. This port is strategically located inside a bay and it is where most freight enters and leaves the country. There is a lesser terminal in the Sajonia neighborhood, and a shuttle port in Ita Enramada, almost opposite the Argentine city of Clorinda, Formosa.

Public transportation is used heavily and is served through buses (locally called colectivos, micros or buses) that reach all the regions of the city and surrounding dormitory communities. From October 23, 2020, an electronic card is required to use these buses. There are two cards available from two different providers: "Jaha" (Guarani for Let's Go) and "Más" (Spanish for More).

The main long-distance bus terminal (TOA, or Terminal de Ómnibus de Asunción) is on the República Argentina Avenue and its bus services connect all of the Departments of Paraguay, as well as international routes to nearby countries such as Argentina, Brazil, Bolivia and Uruguay. Some 115 companies service more than 1,300 departures per day. As many as 55,000 passengers depart on these routes daily, with demand peaking on special occasions like Holy Week and New Year's Day.

Silvio Pettirossi International Airport is Paraguay's main national and international gateway, located at Luque, suburb of the capital, Asunción. It is named after Paraguayan aviator Silvio Petrossi and is formerly known as Presidente Stroessner International Airport. As Paraguay's busiest airport, it is the hub of Latam Paraguay and Paranair.

Bolt and Uber are available for ride-share clients, and compete with various taxi companies. Payment in cash (efectivo) is the standard, except when using an app to pre-pay via credit or debit card. Cash is the default payment for most day-to-day needs, including most transportation, meals, and lodging.

Tourist attractions

The city is home to the Godoy Museum, the Museo Nacional de Bellas Artes (which contains paintings from the 19th century), the Church of La Encarnación, the Metropolitan Cathedral and the National Pantheon of the Heroes, a smaller version of Les Invalides in Paris, where many of the nation's heroes are entombed. Other landmarks include the Palacio de los López, the old Senate building (a modern building opened to house Congress in 2003) and the Casa de la Independencia (one of the few examples of colonial architecture remaining in the city).

Calle Palma is the main street downtown where several historical buildings, plazas, shops, restaurants and cafés are located. The "Manzana de la Rivera", located in front of the Presidential Palace, is a series of old traditional homes that have been restored and serve as a museum showcasing the architectural evolution of the city. The old railway station operates as a museum. There is a proposed train route(2027) from here to the cities of Luque and Areguá. Near Asunción, about thirty minutes outside the city there is also a beautiful lake in the city of San Bernardino. People usually go here during the summer and it is a nice place to visit when the weather is warm.

Asunción also has luxurious malls that contain shops selling well-known brands. The biggest shopping malls are Shopping del Sol; Mariscal López Shopping, Shopping Villa Morra in the central part of the city, Shopping Multiplaza on the outskirts of the city and the Mall Excelsior located downtown. Pinedo Shopping and San Lorenzo Shopping are the newest and also sizeable shopping malls located just  from Asunción's boundaries respectively, in the city of San Lorenzo, part of Greater Asunción. In 2016 a new shopping mall, La Galeria, was inaugurated. It is in between the blue towers, and is now the largest shopping mall in the country.

Sports

Association football is the main sport in Paraguay, and Asunción is home to some of the most important and traditional teams in the country. These include Olimpia, Cerro Porteño, Club Libertad, Club Nacional, Club Guaraní and Club Sol de América, which have their own stadiums and sport facilities for affiliated members. The Defensores del Chaco stadium is the main football stadium of the country and is located in the neighborhood of Sajonia, just a few blocks away from the center of Asunción. Since it is a national stadium sometimes it is used for other activities such as rock concerts. Asunción is also the heart of Paraguayan rugby union.

Culture
Being the third-oldest capital city of South America, after Quito and Lima, Asunción has plenty to offer, culturally speaking, from Spanish colonial-era buildings (Baroque to neo-Gothic), museums or urban parks, this classic city also hosts several symphony orchestras, ballet, opera and theater companies. The most well known orchestras are the City of Asunción's Symphony Orchestra (OSCA), the National Symphony Orchestra and the Northern University Symphony Orchestra. Among professional ballet companies, most renowned are the Asunción Classic and Modern Municipal Ballet, the National Ballet and the Northern University Ballet. The main opera company is the Northern University Opera Company. A long-standing theater company is Arlequín Theater Foundation's. Traditional venues include the Municipal Theater, the Paraguayan-Japanese Center, the Central Bank's Great Lyric Theater, the Juan de Salazar Cultural Center, the Americas Theater, the Tom Jobim Theater, the Arlequín Theater and the Manzana de la Rivera. Among the many venues for concerts in the city, the Jockey Club (Asunción) is one of the most important. Asunción is also the center of Architecture in Paraguay.

The seven treasures of cultural heritage material of Asunción
The choice of the seven treasures of cultural heritage material has been developed Asunción during the months of April and May 2009. Promoted by the "Organización Capital Americana de la Cultura", with the collaboration of the Paraguayan authorities participating in the election was carried out with the intention to disclose the material cultural heritage of Assumption. 

A total of 45 candidates have chosen to become one of the treasures of cultural heritage material Assumption. The result of the vote, which involved 12,417 people, is as follows:

Nightlife 
Nightlife revolves around two areas: one in the downtown part of the city and the other in the neighborhoods of Manora and Las Carmelitas, an area full of nightclubs and bars.

Media

Newspapers
The most read newspapers are: Diario La Nación, Diario Hoy, Diario ABC, Diario Última Hora, and Diario Crónica, although the most successful are ABC and Última Hora.

Television
The most important TV channel are SNT and the other free to air channels Paravisión, Sur TV, Unicanal, Latele, C9N, RPC, Telefuturo and the public station of TV Paraguay TV.

Notable people

Miguel Almirón (born 1994), Paraguayan footballer 
Augusto Roa Bastos (1917–2005), writer
Joshua Dürksen (born 2003), racing driver
José Asunción Flores (1904 – 1972), composer
Erik López (born 2001), footballer
Osvaldo Pangrazio (born 1957), former footballer
Paolo Roberto Ortíz (born 1985), footballer
Victor Pecci (born 1955), tennis player
Willi Plett (born 1955), ice hockey player
Roque Santa Cruz (born 1981), footballer
Berta Rojas (born 1966), musician, professor
Rodrigo Roman (born 1986), Paraguayan footballer
Mario Saldívar (born 1990), Paraguayan footballer
Miguel Almiron (born 1994), footballer 
Sharlene Wells Hawkes (born 1964), Paraguayan-American author, singer and reporter
Nadia Ferreira (born 1999) Paraguayan model.

Twin towns – sister cities
Asunción is twinned with:

 Brasília, Brazil
 Buenos Aires, Argentina
 Campinas, Brazil
 Canelones, Uruguay
 Chapecó, Brazil
 Chiba, Japan
 Curitiba, Brazil
 Florianópolis, Brazil
 Florida, Uruguay
 La Paz, Bolivia
 Lima, Peru
 Madrid, Spain
 Medellín, Colombia
 Miami-Dade County, United States
 Montevideo, Uruguay
 La Plata, Argentina
 Quito, Ecuador
 Resistencia, Argentina 
 Río Cuarto, Argentina
 Rosario, Argentina
 San José, Costa Rica
 Santa Cruz de la Sierra, Bolivia
 Santo Domingo, Dominican Republic
 São Paulo, Brazil
 São Vicente, Brazil
 Songpa (Seoul), South Korea
 Taipei, Taiwan
 Tarija, Bolivia
 Vitoria-Gasteiz, Spain
 Yerba Buena, Argentina

Cooperation agreements
Asunción also cooperates with:
 Mar del Plata, Argentina
 Viña del Mar, Chile
 Brussels, Belgium
 Geneva, Switzerland
 Lyon, France
 Lisbon, Portugal
 European Union

See also

References

External links

 
 Senatur Asunción Info (in Spanish)
 Municipality of Asunción (in Spanish)
 Asuncion Climate and Temperature

 
Capital districts and territories
Capitals in South America
Districts of Paraguay
Populated places established in 1537
Populated places in Paraguay
Articles which contain graphical timelines
1537 establishments in the Spanish Empire